Camponotus quercicola is a species of ant in the family Formicidae that is endemic to California and commonly nests in oak trees, as they usually inhabit oak forests.

References

Further reading

 
 
 
 
 
 
 

quercicola
Insects described in 1954